Saint Louis Roman Catholic Church is the oldest Catholic parish in Buffalo, New York. It was the first Catholic church built in Buffalo, and holds the title of "Mother Church of the Roman Catholic Diocese of Buffalo".

History
The parish was established January 5, 1829 with land contributed by Louis Stephen LeCouteulx de Caumont, a French nobleman. The first church, constructed of logs, was completed in 1831. The congregation was largely French, German and Irish. In 1837, the Irish members left to establish St. Patrick's Church, at Washington and Clinton. A larger brick church on the same site was completed in 1843. In 1846 a large group of the French congregants withdrew to form their own parish. Among the German parishioners left were prosperous and highly respected businessmen.

The church was destroyed by fire in 1885, setting the stage for the construction of the current church in 1889.

Architecture

The historic Gothic Revival third church is located at 35 Edward Street. The church is laid out in a Latin-cross floor plan and features a 245 ft octagonal Medina sandstone steeple with a Seth Thomas clock. Above the steeple rests a 72 ft pierced spire; reputed to be the tallest open-work spire ever built completely of stone (without reinforcement) in USA.  Inside the church is a 1903 Kimball Organ, which is located in the choir loft.

In 1958, due to erosion of the masonry, the turret was rebuilt. Restoration was done on the transept entry in 2003.

Major structural events:

Gallery

References

External links

 
 Emporis building page
 Skyscraperpage building page

Roman Catholic churches in New York (state)
Gothic Revival church buildings in New York (state)
Religious organizations established in 1829
19th-century Roman Catholic church buildings in the United States
Roman Catholic churches in Buffalo, New York
Roman Catholic churches completed in 1889
Roman Catholic Diocese of Buffalo